Éric Roger Virgile Lindmann (born 25 January 1975) is a retired French Paralympic swimmer who competed in international level events.

References

1975 births
Living people
Sportspeople from Saint-Étienne
Sportspeople from Rennes
Paralympic swimmers of France
Swimmers at the 1992 Summer Paralympics
Swimmers at the 1996 Summer Paralympics
Swimmers at the 2000 Summer Paralympics
Swimmers at the 2004 Summer Paralympics
Medalists at the 1992 Summer Paralympics
Medalists at the 1996 Summer Paralympics
Medalists at the 2000 Summer Paralympics
Medalists at the 2004 Summer Paralympics
Paralympic medalists in swimming
Paralympic gold medalists for France
Paralympic silver medalists for France
Paralympic bronze medalists for France
S7-classified Paralympic swimmers
French male freestyle swimmers
French male backstroke swimmers
French male breaststroke swimmers
French male medley swimmers
21st-century French people